Donald Diego Millán Rodríguez (born March 21, 1986) is a Colombian professional footballer who plays as an attacking midfielder for Sport Huancayo of the Peruvian Liga 1. He is nicknamed "mago" (magician) for his ability to run the offense with the role of playmaker.

Honours

Club
Universidad César Vallejo
 Torneo del Inca: 2015

Deportivo Binacional
 Torneo Apertura: 2019
 Liga 1: 2019

Individual
 Peruvian Liga 1 Player of the Year: 2019
 Peruvian Liga 1 Team of the Year: 2019

2019 Car Accident
On 2 December 2019, Donald Millán was involved in a car accident along with teammates Juan Pablo Vergara and Jeferson Collazos. The three footballers were headed to Juliaca from Puno to train with Deportivo Binacional as preparation for their upcoming series of matches for the championship round of the Peruvian Liga 1 playoffs. Around 14:30 PET, Vergara's car flipped on the side of the Puno–Juliaca road due to slippery conditions caused by rain and hail. The three were helped out of the vehicle by local rescuers and taken to a local clinic. Millán and Collazos were discharged unharmed but Vergara was in critical condition. Hours later, Binacional announced the death of Vergara.

References

External links

1986 births
Living people
Colombian footballers
Colombian expatriate footballers
Association football midfielders
Deportivo Cali footballers
Atlético Huila footballers
Deportes Tolima footballers
América de Cali footballers
Cortuluá footballers
Cúcuta Deportivo footballers
Real Cartagena footballers
La Equidad footballers
Club Deportivo Universidad César Vallejo footballers
Universidad Técnica de Cajamarca footballers
Categoría Primera A players
Peruvian Primera División players
Footballers from Cali
Deportivo Binacional FC players
Club Universitario de Deportes footballers
Colombian expatriate sportspeople in Peru
Expatriate footballers in Peru
20th-century Colombian people
21st-century Colombian people